Amara Karba Bangoura (born 10 March 1986, in Kamsar) is a Guinean footballer. He currently plays for Vannes OC in France. Bangoura also represents Guinea internationally.

References

Guinean footballers
Guinea international footballers
Guinean expatriate footballers
Expatriate footballers in France
Valenciennes FC players
Vannes OC players
Ligue 1 players
Ligue 2 players
1986 births
Living people
Olympique Club de Khouribga players
Association football midfielders